Vietnam has an embassy in Buenos Aires, Argentina, the ambassador being concurrent to Uruguay. Uruguay has an embassy in Hanoi.

Both countries are members of the Group of 77.

Economic relations
Bilateral trade is being intensely promoted. Uruguay is selling beef, historically its main export commodity, to Vietnam. In 2012, Uruguay took part in the Vietnam-Latin America Forum.

See also
 Foreign relations of Uruguay
 Foreign relations of Vietnam

References

Bilateral relations of Vietnam
Vietnam